Timothy John Green  (born December 16, 1963) is a retired professional American football player, a radio and television personality, and a best-selling author. He was a linebacker and defensive end with the Atlanta Falcons of the National Football League (NFL), a commentator for National Public Radio, and the former host of the 2005 revival of A Current Affair produced by 20th Television. In November 2018, Green announced that he was diagnosed with ALS.

Football and television career
Green graduated from Liverpool High School in 1982 and attended nearby Syracuse University. He graduated summa cum laude in 1986, and from SU's College of Law in 1994. He was named a two-time Academic All-American. Green was a first-round selection in the 1986 NFL Draft, taken 17th overall by the Atlanta Falcons. Green would play for eight seasons with the Falcons before retiring after the 1993 season.

In 1985, Green was a contestant in the Crystal Light National Aerobic Championship.

Following his eight-year playing career, Green began his career in broadcasting. Serving as a commentator for the NFL on Fox, Comedy Central's BattleBots and on NPR before moving on to host the brief 2005 revival of A Current Affair and later on the American version of the Australian show Find My Family with Lisa Joyner in 2009.

In December 2011, Green was named a winner of the NCAA Silver Anniversary Award, given annually to six former NCAA student-athletes for distinguished career accomplishment on the 25th anniversary of their college graduation.

Writing career

Since his retirement from football, Green had written nearly forty novels ranging from adult suspense to youth sports. His youth sports series in particular would become his best selling works as an author, with many of his works reaching The New York Times best-seller list of children's chapter books. He serves on the National Writer's Project Writing Council

Legal career and apartment management

As an attorney, Green has been counsel with the law firm Barclay Damon LLP in New York State since February 1999. He has assisted in growing and developing the firm's client base, focusing on energy and intellectual property. In May 2014, Green partnered with former Assistant District Attorney Scott Brenneck. Their firm, Team Green Lawyers, PLLC, is composed of former prosecutors that are now working privately and offering criminal defense services.

Green owns $26 million worth of apartment complexes in central New York as well as buildings in Vernon, Utica, and Plattsburgh, New York. They are managed by a company, Green National, that he owns with his son. The largest building, Skyline Apartments in Syracuse, New York, is a 12-story 364-unit building which has become the source of local controversy, having been cited for numerous code violations as well as security and accessibility concerns. In March 2021, a woman was murdered in the building, and local police said they were "frustrated with the efforts of management" at the building, which tenants say has worsened since the Greens took over.

Personal life

Green lives in upstate New York with his wife, Illyssa, five children, and three dogs.

Green was diagnosed with a slow-progressing form of amyotrophic lateral sclerosis in 2016, a diagnosis he didn't reveal publicly until November 14, 2018, in a Facebook post. He was featured on the November 18 edition of 60 Minutes and the NFL on Fox's Thanksgiving broadcast on November 22, discussing his life and struggles with the disease.

Bibliography

Fiction
 1993 Ruffians (Turner Publishing)
 1996 Outlaws
 1998 The Red Zone
 1999 Double Reverse
 1999 Titans
 2000 The Letter of The Law (Warner Books)
 2002 The Fourth Perimeter (Warner Books)
 2003 The Fifth Angel
 2004 The First 48
 2005 Pie World 
 2006 Kingdom Come
 2006 American Outrage
 2007 Football Genius
 2008 Football Hero
 2009 Football Champ
 2009 Above The Law
 2009 Baseball Great
 2010 False Convictions
 2010 Rivals
 2010 The Big Time
 2011 Best of the Best
 2011 Deep Zone
 2012 Pinch Hit
 2012 Unstoppable
 2013 Force Out
 2013 Perfect Season
 2014 New Kid
 2014 Home Run
 2015 Lost Boy
 2015 Kid Owner
 2016 Left Out
 2017 Baseball Genius
 2018 The Big Game

Non-fiction
 1997 A Man and His Mother: An Adopted Son's Search
 1997 The Dark Side of the Game: My Life in the NFL
 2003 The Road To The NFL

References

External links
 

1963 births
Living people
All-American college football players
Atlanta Falcons players
College Football Hall of Fame inductees
Syracuse Orange football players
Syracuse University College of Law alumni
College football announcers
National Football League announcers
People with motor neuron disease
National Football League replacement players
Liverpool High School alumni